Frommenhausen is a suburban district of Rottenburg am Neckar in the administrative district of Tübingen in Baden-Württemberg (Germany).

Geography 

Frommenhausen is located 9 km (5.59 mi) southwestern from Rottenburg am Neckar on the  Gäu-Plateau with an elevation from 369 to 493 m.

Extent 

The area of the district is 362 hectares. Thereof fall 73.4% upon agriculturally used area, 14.7% upon forest area, 9.4% upon settlement area and roads, and 1.9% upon other.

Neighbour localities 

The territories of the following villages adjoin to Frommenhausen, they are called clockwise beginning in the north: Schwalldorf, Hirrlingen and Wachendorf.
All villages are in the admin. district of Tübingen.

Population 

The village has a population of 467 people(31/01/08). So it is the smallest district of Rottenburg. At an area of 3.62 km2 (2.2 sq mi) this corresponds to a population density of 129 people per km2, or 334 per sq mi.

Faiths 

Most of the population is Roman Catholic.

References

External links 
 Official Webpage (German)

Rottenburg am Neckar